Bridge to Brisbane is an annual long-distance fun run over a distance of  or  held in Brisbane, Australia in August.

The first race occurred in 1997 with fewer than 5000 entrants and each year the event raises funds for charity. 2007 saw 24,350 runners participate. In 2007 the Bridge to Brisbane attracted a field of up to 30,000 runners, while 2008 saw more than 36,000 people join the race and in 2009 more than 45,000 people took part.

Route
Until 2015, the race began at the southern side of the Eastern Sir Leo Hielscher Bridge in Lytton and finished at the Ekka showgrounds in Bowen Hills. The route travels along Kingsford Smith Drive and the Inner City Bypass, towards the city via the suburbs of Hamilton and Bowen Hills. In 2016 the course was moved to Brisbane City. The start line is in Spring Hill and participants cross three bridges before finishing in South Bank Parklands in South Brisbane. Since 2021, the race has used its original course again.

A recent addition has been the incorporation of a  race (from Breakfast Creek) starting later than the full  race, with some runners competing in both.

Originally the race was called the 'Bridge to Bay' and instead of heading from the Gateway Bridge towards Brisbane, it headed towards the coast line finishing at Manly. The end of the race was then moved to New Farm Park. In 2007 the roads in the suburbs of Fortitude Valley and New Farm became gridlocked. This traffic congestion prompted another change of moving the finish to the RNA Showgrounds.

Participation

Results

See also

 List of largest footraces

References

External links
 Bridge to Brisbane website

Sport in Brisbane
10K runs
Athletics competitions in Australia
Recurring sporting events established in 1997
Annual events in Brisbane
1997 establishments in Australia
Annual sporting events in Australia
Athletics in Queensland